Torrelles de Llobregat is a municipality in the comarca of the Baix Llobregat 
in the province of Barcelona, Catalonia, Spain.

Catalunya en Miniatura, the largest of the 14 miniature parks present in Europe, is located here, 17 km from Barcelona.

References

External links

 Website of the Municipality of Torrelles de Llobregat 
 Government data pages 

Municipalities in Baix Llobregat